Micropistus is a genus of beetles in the family Buprestidae, containing the following species:

 Micropistus dilatatus Kurosawa, 1982
 Micropistus hirashimai Kurosawa, 1990
 Micropistus ingeiceps (Saunders, 1872)
 Micropistus microcephalus Thery, 1923

References

Buprestidae genera